Vater means "father" in German. It is also a surname. It may refer to: 

 Abraham Vater, a German anatomist
 Ampulla of Vater, an anatomic area named after Abraham Vater
 VACTERL association, sometimes called VATER syndrome, a group of congenital anomalies
 Christian Vater (organ builder), a German organ and harpsichord builder
 Antoine Vater, a harpsichord builder in France.
 Vater Percussion, an American drumstick and percussion accessory manufacturer
 Vater (album), a Janus album

Other uses
Vatër,  the domestic hearth in Albanian folklore

See also
 Vader (disambiguation)